Megaceron is a genus of beetles in the family Cerambycidae, containing the following species:

 Megaceron antennicrassum (Martins, 1960)
 Megaceron australe (Martins, 1960)

References

Ibidionini